Gora  is a Bengali-language streaming television series streaming on Hoichoi from January 7, 2022. The series is directed by Sayantan Ghosal and stars Ritwick Chakraborty (who makes his streaming series debut), Ishaa Saha, Suhotra Mukhopadhyay, and others.

Plot 
A serial killer is targetting the literary greats of Kolkata. Private detective Gourab Sen, aka Gora, has a reputation of being a serial-killer specialist. Now it falls upon the eccentric detective to catch the killer.

Cast 
 Ritwick Chakraborty as Gourab Sen, aka Gora
 Ishaa Saha as Somlata
 Suhotra Mukhopadhyay as Sarathi, Gora's side-kick and sister's fiancée
 Ananya Sen as Konka, Gora's sister
 Anuradha Roy as Gora's mother
 Abhijit Guha as Inspector Tarapada Sarkhel
 Payel De as Supriya
 Koushik Chattopadhyay as Tanmoy Talukder,a writer
 Judhajit Sarkar as Dr. Pakrashi

Overview

Season 1 (2022)
The series started streaming on the OTT platform hoichoi from 7th January 2022 with eight episodes.

References

External links

Indian web series
2022 web series debuts
Bengali-language web series
Hoichoi original programming